The  is a women's professional wrestling tag team championship owned by the World Wonder Ring Stardom promotion.

Title history

On August 2, 2011, Stardom held a press conference to announce the first ever Goddesses of Stardom Tag League, which would culminate in the crowning of the first Goddess of Stardom Champions. The finals of the tournament took place on November 27, 2011, and saw BY Hou (Yoko Bito & Yuzuki Aikawa) defeat Kawasaki Katsushika Saikyou Densetsu (Natsuki☆Taiyo and Yoshiko) to become the inaugural champions. The title belt was crafted by American company Top Rope Belts. 

Like most professional wrestling championships, the title is won as a result of a scripted match. There have been 26 reigns shared among 25 different teams consisting of 35 distinctive wrestlers. 7Upp (Nanae Takahashi and Yuu) are the current champions in their first reign as a team.

Reigns

Combined reigns

By team

By wrestler

See also
International Ribbon Tag Team Championship
NXT Women's Tag Team Championship
WWE Women's Tag Team Championship
Oz Academy Tag Team Championship
Wave Tag Team Championship
Women's World Tag Team Championship

References

External links
World Wonder Ring Stardom's official website
Goddess of Stardom Championship history at Wrestling-Titles.com

World Wonder Ring Stardom championships
Women's professional wrestling tag team championships